The 2023 Belgian Cup Final, named Croky Cup after the sponsor, will be the 68th Belgian Cup final and is scheduled to be played on 30 April 2023. KV Mechelen qualified for its seventh Belgian Cup Final on 28 February 2023, and already won the tournament twice, first in 1987 and more recently in 2019. Two days later, Antwerp also qualified, which will be their fifth appearance in the final, having already won the cup three times, most notably in 1992 when they also met KV Mechelen and a penalty shoot-out ended in their favor.

Route to the final

Match

Details

Notes

References

External links
   

Belgian Cup finals
Cup Final
Belgian Cup Final
Sports competitions in Brussels
Belgian Cup Final
K.V. Mechelen matches
Royal Antwerp F.C. matches